This is a list of years in India. See also the timeline of Indian history. For only articles about years in India that have been written, see Category:Years in India.

Republic of India

Twenty-first century

Twentieth century

British India

Nineteenth century

Eighteenth century

Seventeenth century

Fifteenth century

See also 
 List of years by country
 Timeline of Indian history

 
India history-related lists
India